This article is about the demographics of the Kingdom of Yugoslavia between 1918 and 1941, since its creation until its occupation and partition by Axis powers. The first census in 1921 enumarated 11,984,911, while the second and last census in 1931 enumerated 13,934,038 people. While both censuses grouped ethnic groups according to their mother tongue, the latter did not record separate constituent nationalities and reported all "Serbo-Croato-Slovene" speakers as "Yugoslavs".

Ethnic groups

Vital statistics (1919–1940)

Marriages and divorces (1919–1940)

Languages
The following data, grouped by first language, is from the 1921 population census:
 Serbo-Croatian: 8,911,509 (74.4%)
 Serbs and Montenegrins: 44.6%
 Croats: 23.5%
 Muslims of Yugoslavia: 6.3%
 Slovene: 1,019,997 (8.5%)
 German: 505,790 (4.2%)
 Hungarian: 467,658 (3.9%)
 Albanian: 439,657 (3.7%)
 Romanian: 231,068 (1.9%)
 Turkish: 150,322 (1.3%)
 Czech and Slovak: 115,532 (1.0%)
 Ruthenian: 25,615 (0.2%)
 Russian: 20,568 (0.2%)
 Polish: 14,764 (0.1%)
 Italian: 12,553 (0.1%)
 Others: 69,878 (0.6%)

Based on language, the Yugoslavs (collectively Serbs, Croats, Slovenes and other South-Slavic groups in the kingdom) constituted 82.9% of the country's population.

Religious groups
 Christian: 10,571,569 (88.2%)
 Eastern Orthodox: 5,593,057 (46.7%)
 Roman Catholic: 4,708,657 (39.3%)
 Protestant: 229,517 (1.9%)
 Greek Catholic: 40,338 (0.3%)
 Sunni Muslim: 1,345,271 (11.2%)
 Jewish: 64,746 (0.5%)
 others: 1,944 (nil%)
 atheists: 1,381 (nil%)

Class and occupation
 Agriculture, forestry and fishing – 78.9%
 Industry and handicrafts – 9.9%
 Banking, trade and traffic – 4.4%
 Public service, free profession and military – 3.8%
 Other professions – 3.1%

References

Demographics